The Downs Gaelic Athletic Association (Na Dúnta Cumann Lúthchleas Gael) is a Gaelic football and ladies' Gaelic football club located in County Westmeath, Ireland.

History
The club was founded in 1893 and has used a variety of names: Woodown Rackers, The Downs Pigeons, The Downs Clan Lár and The Downs St Ciarán's. The Downs have won ten county titles and in 1972 reached the final of the Leinster Senior Club Football Championship, losing to St Vincents.

Honours

Gaelic football
 Westmeath Senior Football Championship (10): 1918, 1968, 1969, 1970, 1972, 1974, 1980, 2003, 2005, 2022
 Westmeath Intermediate Football Championship (1): 1950 
 Westmeath Junior Football Championship (5): 1907, 1927, 1934, 1949, 1964 
 Westmeath Senior Football League (11): 1966, 1968, 1969, 1970, 1972, 1976, 1980, 1986, 1987, 1988, 1989

Notable players
 Paddy Flanagan
 Luke Loughlin
 Jonathan Lynam
 Brendan Murtagh

References

External links
Official website

Gaelic games clubs in County Westmeath
Gaelic football clubs in County Westmeath